Elgin was a station on the Chicago Aurora and Elgin Railroad, where it was the western terminus of the Elgin branch. Throughout the early 20th century, it also connected with the Elgin and Belvidere Railway and Aurora, Elgin and Fox River Electric Company (AE&FRE) interurbans.

History
Elgin was opened by the Aurora, Elgin and Chicago Railway (AE&C) on May 23, 1903. The AE&C became bankrupt in 1919, and was split into two divisionsthe Chicago Aurora and Elgin Railroad (CA&E) to handle interurban affairs, and the Aurora, Elgin and Fox River Electric Company (AE&FRE) to deal with the Fox River Valley, in 1921.

By 1914, the Elgin and Belvidere Railway connected with the AE&C and the future AE&FRE at the Elgin station. The Elgin and Belvidere was powered by 600V direct current overhead wires and received its power from the AE&C. Elgin and Belvidere stations were maintained jointly by the railway and the lines it connected with, and schedules between the lines were closely coordinated to create "practically a through service to from points north and west of Belvidere to Chicago, and all points on the [AE&C]." The Elgin and Belvidere, having consolidated to form the Elgin, Belvidere and Rockford Railway in 1927, ceased operations at 1 a.m. on March 10, 1930; notice of the service's discontinuation was posted at the Elgin station.

Long struggling, the CA&E discontinued passenger service at midday on July 3, 1957. Passengers who had taken the morning trains to Chicago were caught unaware by this development and had to find alternative transportation home.

Notes

References

Works cited

1903 establishments in Illinois
1930 disestablishments in Illinois
1957 disestablishments in Illinois
Railway stations opened in 1903
Railway stations closed in 1930
Railway stations closed in 1957